The Manx Labour Party is a political party on the Isle of Man that was founded in 1918.

Policies

The Manx Labour Party published a manifesto of policies in 2021. It proposed increasing government spending on education to a minimum of 4% of GDP, stated opposition to privatisation of the healthcare sector, and supported increasing the statutory minimum wage.

History
The Manx Labour Party was formed in 1918, making it the first organised political party on the island. Its formation was prompted by the high level of indirect taxation as a proportion of the Isle of Man Government's income, the relatively low wages, and the lack of social legislation. The founders of the party saw that as being unfair to the poorest in society and wanted to increase the reliance on income taxation instead, and to introduce social legislation such as old age pensions. Christopher R. Shimmin, a founder of the MLP, had written in 1915; "In Manxland there is no state insurance, no worker's compensation, no factory laws, and for the aged worker, when poor and feebly tottering to the grave, no old age pension. Rightly has the Isle of Man been called "A paradise for the rich but a purgatory for the poor'.

The Manx Labour Party had its roots in the Chartist movement on the Isle of Man, the union movement, various reforming organisations such as the Manx Reform League, and a culture of debating societies and self-education societies focused around the Island's various churches. Like similar parties in neighbouring countries, the MLP's influences were more Methodist than Marxist.

The election of 1919 which brought Manx Labour MHKs into Tynwald followed increasing pressure for reform from the working and middle classes during WW1. The Manx general strike of 1918 was in support of a bread subsidy to be paid for through by income tax, to counter the high food prices caused by wartime shortages, and a widespread lack of household income caused by the collapse of the Island's visiting industry. Meanwhile, Tynwald was receiving substantial payments from the UK for hosting WW1 internment camps. The strike started on 4 July and forced Governor Raglan to cancel the 1918 Tynwald Day ceremony. Raglan eventually backed down over the bread subsidy, and subsequently left the Island on long term sick leave. Alf Teare, founder of the Manx branch of the Workers’ Union and one of the leaders of the strike, was described in 1918 as ‘the most powerful man on the Island.’ It was a remarkable testament to the reversal of fortunes which wartime conditions had produced.

Between 1919, when Labour Party candidates stood in every constituency on the island bar one, and 1946, the party won between four and seven seats in the House of Keys.

In 1920 the new Tynwald started a programme of social reform. In 1920 Old Age pensions were introduced, a National Health Insurance Act was passed, a new Education Act was passed, and a school medical service established. In 1921 a Shop Hours Act was passed, and a winter works scheme was set up, to do works such as building promenades. Unemployment was higher in winter as most of the tourist industry, agriculture and fishing work was in the summer season. From 1922 to 1924 a housing programme was extended across the Island.

In 1933 Marion Shimmin of the MLP was the first woman MHK ever elected. She was the widow of recently deceased Christopher R. Shimmin, and replaced him as MHK for Peel.

At the 1946 election the party had high hopes of emulating the British Labour Party's success in the 1945 UK general election and contested the election on a staunchly socialist manifesto. The party contested every seat in the House of Keys except the Speaker's seat, but won only two. During the 1950s and 1960s the party made a limited recovery, but it has never been able to achieve the level of representation it had before 1946.

Since its founding, the Manx Labour Party had campaigned every election on a policy of nationalising land, transport and public utilities. However, after the party's defeat in the 1946 general election Manx Labour removed the policy of nationalisation from its party programme and has not campaigned on any policy of nationalisation since.

In the 2001 election, the party polled the highest percentage of votes (17.3%) among the parties standing, and two of its three candidates won seats. However, independent candidates won the vast bulk of the votes and seats at the election, and the  political pressure group, Alliance for Progressive Government, won more seats (three), despite getting a smaller share of the vote (14.6%).

The Manx Labour Party has had continuous influence in Tynwald while it had members there, as MLP members were appointed as ministers and board chairmen as a matter of course. This is part of the Island's manner of politics which has usually been based on coalition and consensus in modern times, with most Tynwald members having some administrative responsibility.

The Liberal Vannin Party was founded by Peter Karran who was, until 2004, a Member of the House of Keys for the Manx Labour Party.

David Cretney was the only Manx Labour Party candidate to successfully stand in the 2011 general election.

In March 2013 Michael Ronald Coleman, who had previously failed in his bid to be popularly elected to the House of Keys in the 2006 general election (16.3% of the poll), was made a member of the Legislative Council.

Since 2015 former MHK David Cretney was a member of the Legislative council, giving the party its second seat, until his tenure ended in February 2020.

Michael Coleman's tenure ended in March 2018, leaving David Cretney as the party's sole representative, until his tenure ended in February 2020.

In 2018 Manx Labour was a founding member of the Isle of Man Climate Change Coalition following the IPCC report of that year calling for urgent action.

Joney Faragher was elected as the new leader and Sarah Maltby as the new Chair of the Manx Labour Party on Saturday 27 June 2020.

Election results

Local government

The party's electoral renaissance began in October 2020 when Devon Watson and Samuel Hamer won both available seats in the Derby Ward by-election for Douglas Borough Council.

The 2021 Local Authority elections were contested by Devon Watson, Samuel Hamer and Peter Washington in Douglas and Fenella Logan in Onchan. Devon Watson and Peter Washington were elected to Douglas Borough Council, and Fenella Logan was elected as an Onchan Commissioner.

House of Keys

For the 2021 general election the party put forward three candidates. Joney Faragher in Douglas East and Sarah Maltby in Douglas South both topped their respective polls, while Gareth Young in Garff came a credible third with 1021 votes.

References

Notes 

 1.There was no contest in South Douglas. The two Manx Labour candidates were elected unopposed.

Labour parties
Political parties in the Isle of Man
Social democratic parties in the United Kingdom
Socialism in the Isle of Man
Political parties established in 1918